The Landwind CV9, sometimes also called Landwind Fashion, is a compact MPV produced by the Chinese manufacturer Landwind.

Overview

After the Jiangling Landwind and Landwind GS6, the car is the third attempt by the Chinese manufacturer to gain a foothold in the European market. The vehicle is again in the specialist press, especially in the context of a comparatively poor crash test result with two out of five stars. However, this result is mainly due to the very rudimentary safety equipment as standard, while earlier vehicles from Chinese manufacturers mostly also showed massive structural weaknesses. Side airbags are optionally available for the vehicle, which is why they were not used in the test.

The basic version of the vehicle is offered with a 71 kW 1.6 petrol engine, a 2.0 engine and later also an electric version was planned. The basic version was approved in 2011 by Kraftfahrt-Bundesamt under HSN/TSN 1568 / AAA; in liability insurance, the vehicle was classified for 2012 in the middle type class 17.

References

CV9
Compact MPVs
Front-wheel-drive vehicles
Minivans
Cars introduced in 2006